Operation Rhino was a raid led by the United States Army's 75th Ranger Regiment (Regimental Reconnaissance Company) and (3rd Ranger Battalion), who were led by Colonel Joseph Votel, and other SOCOM units  on several Taliban targets in and around Kandahar, Afghanistan during the invasion of Afghanistan at the start of the War in Afghanistan.

Plan
The Ranger's objectives were to:

 Seize the landing strip (to become Camp Rhino)
 Destroy any Taliban forces 
 Gather intelligence 
 Assess the suitability of the landing strip for future operations 
 Establish a forward aerial refuel/rearm point (FARP) for helicopters involved in the nearby operation at Objective Gecko
 Destroy major weapons and utilities

Operation

In October of 2001, a Ranger Reconnaissance team jumped into Afghanistan to recon the airfield. On the night of 19 October 2001, before the Rangers dropped, several targets on and around the objective were targeted by U.S. air power, first by bombs dropped from B-2 stealth bombers, then by fire from orbiting AC-130 aircraft. These air strikes resulted in a number of Taliban KIAs and several Taliban forces fleeing the area. Following the air strikes, the 4 MC-130 Combat Talon aircraft flew over the drop zone (DZ) at 800 feet. In zero illumination, the Rangers proceeded to exit the MC-130s.

No U.S. casualties were suffered in the operation itself but 2 Rangers assigned to Combat Search and Rescue element supporting the mission were killed when their MH-60L helicopter crashed at Objective Honda in Pakistan - a temporary staging site used by a company of Rangers from 3/75.  The helicopter crashed due to a brownout.

Result

As a result of the raid, a base was set up over the airstrip and named Camp Rhino. It was then handed off to the 15th Marine Expeditionary Unit, who began leading forward operations throughout Kandahar along with the U.S. Army's 101st Airborne Division.

References

Conflicts in 2001
Battles of the War in Afghanistan (2001–2021)
Rhino
Rhino
United States Army Rangers
2001 in Afghanistan
United States Marine Corps in the War in Afghanistan (2001–2021)
History of Kandahar Province
Battles in 2001